John Thompson McEldowney (26 October 1947 – 17 June 2012) was a New Zealand rugby union player. A prop, McEldowney represented Taranaki at a provincial level, and was a member of the New Zealand national side, the All Blacks, in 1976 and 1977. He played 10 matches for the All Blacks including two internationals.

References

1947 births
2012 deaths
Rugby union players from New Plymouth
People educated at New Plymouth Boys' High School
New Zealand rugby union players
New Zealand international rugby union players
Taranaki rugby union players
Rugby union props